Douglas M. McEnulty (January 16, 1922 – January 12, 1991) was an American football player in the National Football League. Born in Tonganoxie, Kansas,  McEnulty played college football at Wichita University.

McEnulty played fullback and football. His professional career began in 1942 as a member of the Wichita Aero Commandos, where he started at the two positions before playing with the NFL's Chicago Bears during the 1943 and 1944 seasons. Owing to his size, he was nicknamed "Big Doug".

References

External links
 

1922 births
1991 deaths
American football fullbacks
Chicago Bears players
Wichita State Shockers football players
People from Tonganoxie, Kansas
Players of American football from Kansas